Riccardo Stivanello (born 24 April 2004) is an Italian professional footballer who plays as a centre-back for  club Bologna.

Club career
Raimondo started playing football at Cittadella, before joining Bologna in 2018. On 11 May 2021, he signed his first professional contract with the club. Having worked his way up their youth ranks, he made his professional debut on 21 May 2022, coming on as a substitute in the second half of a 1–0 Serie A win over Genoa.

On 16 June 2022, Stivanello extended his contract with Bologna until 30 June 2025.

International career
Stivanello has represented Italy at several youth international levels, having played for the under-18 and under-19 national teams.

In June 2022, he was included in the Italian squad that took part in the UEFA Under-19 European Championship in Slovakia, where the Azzurrini reached the semi-finals before losing to eventual winners England.

References

External links
 
 
 
 FIGC U18 profile
 FIGC U19 profile

2004 births
Living people
Footballers from Veneto
Italian footballers
Italy youth international footballers
Bologna F.C. 1909 players
Serie A players
Association football defenders